Crooked Fingers is the first studio album by the indie rock band Crooked Fingers. It was released on January 18, 2000, via WARM Records. It was recorded by Eric Bachmann in Seattle, WA, at Ft. Lawton and Denise Maupin's.

Track listing
"Crowned in Chrome" - 3:43
"New Drink for the Old Drunk" - 3:52
"Pigeon Kicker" - 3:18
"Man Who Died of Nothing at All" - 2:54
"Broken Man" - 6:31
"Black Black Ocean" - 4:29
"Juliette" - 4:39
"She Spread Her Legs and Flew Away" - 3:13
"Under Sad Stars" - 5:42
"Little Bleeding" - 6:06

References

2000 debut albums
Crooked Fingers albums